PGU Tiraspol, also known as PGU-Kartina TV Tiraspol due to sponsorship reasons, is a Moldovan handball team located in Tiraspol. They compete in the National Super League of Moldova. They won their last championship in 2015.

Titles 

 National Super League
 Winners (14): 1999, 2000, 2001, 2002, 2003, 2004, 2005, 2006, 2007, 2008, 2010, 2012, 2013, 2015

European record

Team

Current squad 

Squad for the 2016–17 season

Goalkeepers
 Oleg Mamcov
 Denis Potapchin 
 Ion Saharnean

Wingers
RW
  Iaroslav Vitehovschi 
LW 
  Serghei Cusnir
  Oleg Mohovic
Line players 
  Serhii Petrychenko
  Oleh Puzyrevskyi
  Vladislav Turcan

Back players
LB
  Vladislav Bulgar
  Alexandr Lupasco
CB 
  Serghei Bogacic
  Vladimir Brizitchii
  Oleksandr Udovychenko 
RB
  Serghei Boldirev
  Maxim Slagoda

External links
 EHF Club Profile

References

Tiraspol